
Radomsko County is a unit of territorial administration and local government (powiat) in Łódź Voivodeship, central Poland. It came into being on 1 January 1999 as a result of the Polish local government reforms passed in 1998.

As of 2006, it had a total population of 118,856, out of which the population of Radomsko was 49,152, that of Przedbórz was 3,758, that of Kamieńsk was 2,858, and the rural population was 63,088.

Neighboring counties
Radomsko County is bordered by Bełchatów County and Piotrków County to the north, Końskie County and Włoszczowa County to the east, Częstochowa County to the south-west, and Pajęczno County to the west.

Administrative division
The county is subdivided into 14 gminas (one urban, two urban-rural and 11 rural). These are listed in the following table, in descending order of population.

References
Polish official population figures 2006

 
Radomsko